Mark McGuire (born December 31, 1986) is an American musician. A former member of Emeralds, McGuire is a multi-instrumentalist who has been producing solo material since 2007. He has released three solo albums and produces mostly instrumental music that combines electronica and acoustic guitars with psychedelic influences. He has toured internationally as a solo artist supporting among others Julianna Barwick and Jenny Hval while playing headlining shows in Europe, North America, Japan and Australia.

History 

Originally from Cleveland, Ohio, McGuire first picked up a guitar at the age of 9 and played in a variety of high-school bands. In 2005 he joined the first incarnation of Emeralds but continued to work on his own material. Much of these recordings appeared on limited-run CD-Rs and cassettes distributed among friends. His first regular release was a 5-track EP, Solo Acoustic Vol. 2, that was part of a Steve Lowenthal curated series of acoustic songs on the VDSQ label. The record received praise from among others Al Doyle of Hot Chip.

In 2010 he released his first regular solo album Living With Yourself that included various pieces and arrangements recorded over a three-year period. The album was "inspired by my family, the friends I've known the best throughout my life, and everything that has led me to where I am right now". The album appeared on the Austrian label editions Mego to generally favourable reviews.

In 2011 McGuire decided to leave his native city and moved to Portland (OR). In the same year, Peter Rehberg of editions Mego curated and edited a collection of the self-released material McGuire had accumulated of the years. Entitled A Young Person's Guide To Mark McGuire, it contained two discs with twenty selected tracks. Before leaving Cleveland, McGuire had begun work on his next solo album, Get Lost, completing it in the first months after the move. He described it as 'reflection of a lot that was going on inside my head at that time and the things that were happening around me'. Released in September 2011, the album was described by the New York Times as 'album is warm, well paced, reassuring, confident and manageable in length; it's also self-consciously naïve in feeling, floppy and weirdly distant'.

In January 2013 it was announced that McGuire had left Emeralds for unspecified reasons. In the course of the year, he moved to Los Angeles after completing his third solo album, Along the Way. Released on February 3, 2014, through Dead Oceans Records, McGuire described the album as 'about the journey of an individual entering the world, and his quest for true knowledge about the universe and about himself'. From 2013 to 2014 McGuire played with The Afghan Whigs, also appearing on their 2014 album Do to the Beast.

Discography 

Albums
Living With Yourself (2010)Get Lost (2012)Along the Way (2014)Noctilucence (2014) Beyond Belief (2015) Ideas of Beginning (2017)Do You Hear What I Hear (2018)EPSolo Acoustic Vol. 2 (2009)

CollectionA Young Person's Guide to Mark McGuire'' (May 2011)

References

Musicians from Cleveland
1986 births
Living people
Dead Oceans artists